Pleasantville is an unincorporated community in Oley Township, Berks County, Pennsylvania, United States. It is located at the junction of Pennsylvania Route 73 and Covered Bridge Road, a short distance from Manatawny. Important places in Pleasantville include the Pleasantville Park, Pleasantville Covered Bridge, and Pleasantville Evangelical Church.

Gallery

Unincorporated communities in Berks County, Pennsylvania
Unincorporated communities in Pennsylvania